The Coonan Cross Oath, also known as the Great Oath of Bent Cross, the Leaning Cross Oath or the Oath of the Slanting Cross, taken on 3 January 1653 in Mattancherry, was a public avowal by members of the Saint Thomas Christians of the Malabar region in India, that they would not submit to the Jesuits and Latin Catholic hierarchy, nor accept Portuguese dominance in ecclesiastical and secular life. There are various versions about the oath's wording, one version being that the oath was directed against the Portuguese, another that it was directed against Jesuits, and yet another version that it was directed against the authority of Catholic Church.

Saint Thomas Christians were originally in communion with the Church of the East, which practiced East Syriac Rite liturgy. However, the Portuguese did not accept the legitimacy of local ecclesiastical traditions, and they began to impose Latin usages upon the local Christians. At the Synod of Diamper in 1599, presided over by Aleixo de Menezes, the  appointed Latin Catholic Archbishop of Goa and the Primate of the East Indies, a number of such latinisations were imposed, including the preference for Portuguese bishops, changes in the liturgy, the use of Roman vestments, the requirement of clerical celibacy, and the setting up of the Portuguese Inquisition in Goa and Bombay-Bassein which exercised ecclesial jurisdiction in Portuguese Cochin.

In 1653, after half a century of the increasing influence of the Latin Church, the majority of the Saint Thomas Christians resisted  Jesuits, and took the Coonan Cross Oath (1653) at Mattancherry, pledging to liberate themselves from latinisation and Portuguese domination. They elected Thoma I as the archdeacon and head of their community and decided to re-establish intercommunion with older Eastern Churches.

Background

It is believed that the Saint Thomas Christians of Malabar was in communion with the Church of the East from 300 to 1599. Saint Thomas Christians looked to Catholicos-Patriarch of the Church of the East for ecclesiastical authority. Although the bishops from the Middle East were the spiritual rulers of the Church, the general administration of the Church of Kerala was governed by the indigenous Archdeacon. The Archdeacon was the head of Saint Thomas Christians. Even when there were more than one foreign bishop, there was only one Archdeacon for the entire Saint Thomas Christian community. However, with the establishment of Portuguese power in parts of India, the clergy of that empire, in particular members of the Society of Jesus (Jesuits), attempted to Latinise the Indian Christians.

The Portuguese started a Latin Church diocese in Goa (1534) and another at Cochin (1558), and sought to bring the Saint Thomas Christians under the jurisdiction of the Portuguese padroado and into the Latin Rite of the Catholic Church. A series of synods, including the 1585 Synod of Goa, were held, which introduced Latinized elements to the local liturgy. In 1599 Aleixo de Menezes, Archbishop of Goa, led the Synod of Diamper, which finally brought the Saint Thomas Christians formally under the authority of the Latin Archdiocese of Goa.

The independence of the ancient Church of Saint Thomas Christians was rescinded. The padroado rule of the Portuguese was only momentary, for the feelings of resentment and the desire to regain independence among the Thomas Christians were very real and could not be contained for long. Archdeacon Thomas, the leader of the Saint Thomas Christians  had come to the conclusion that no remedy for their sufferings , other than the arrival of an Eastern bishop of the tradition to which they had been accustomed through the centuries. He wrote letters to the Coptic patriarch in Alexandria, the Jacobite  patriarch of Antioch, and the Nestorian patriarch of Babylon, asking them to provide the necessary help. However no answer was received to any of the letters.

In 1652, Ahatallah, an oriental prelate visited India. He is said to have landed at Surat and thence came to Mylapore, where he was arrested by the Jesuits on 3 August 1652. While at Mylapore, Ahatalla met two Syrian Christian deacons, viz: Chengannur ltty and Kuravilangad Kizhakkedath Kurien from Malankara, who were on a pilgrimage to the tomb of St. Thomas and sent a letter through them to the Church of Malankara saying:Behold, I Ignatius, Patriarch of All India and China, send to you a letter through the clerics who came here from your place. When you have read this letter diligently send me two priests and forty men. If however, you wish to send them from your place, send them cautiously, quickly and soon, so that seeing your people they would release me without hindrance. I came to the city of Mylapore thinking that many people come here, and that priests would get me to your place of the Indias. In the year 1652 of our Lord, in the month of August, on Monday, I arrived in Mylapore in the monastery of the Jesuits. In the same monastery I stay, and they help me very much; may their reward increase here and there. Peace be with them, with you, and with us now and always. Amen. I, Ignatius, Patriarch of All India and China. 

He was taken on board a Portuguese ship at Madras bound for Goa, and en route, it touched Cochin. Thomas Christians heard of the arrival of the ship at Cochin. The Archdeacon with a large number of Priests and several thousands of Saint Thomas Christians assembled at Mattancherry Cochin; their efforts to visit Ahatallah when the fleet arrived in Cochin intensified but ultimately, they were not fruitful. Several letters were sent to all the civil and religious authorities in Cochin, for at least an opportunity to visit Ahatallah, to examine his credentials and to verify his identity, promising that if he was found an imposter, they would be the first to press for his punishment. Due to the staunch and intransigent opposition of Archbishop Garcia and the Jesuit priests it did not happen. They informed him that the ship had already sailed for Goa. A rumor was also spread at this time that Ahatallah was drowned by the Portuguese.

What happened to Ahatallah in the midst of the Arabian Sea is still a mystery. The earlier historians have mentioned that Ahatallah was drowned by the Portuguese. Some modern writers state that Ahatallah was not killed in 1653 and he was sent as a prisoner to Lisbon where he died a natural death in the prison. Jacob Kollamparambil, a Church historian says that when the ship carrying Ahatallah reached Goa, he was handed over to the inquisition, and he was kept in close custody in the Jesuit house there. He was sent to Portugal on the ship "Nosa Senhora da Graca" from Goa and reached Lisbon on 14 July 1653. The king of Portugal decided to send him to Rome. Joseph Thekkedath, another Church historian narrates that Vincent De Paul, who met Ahatallah at Paris, mentions him in the following words "There remains in this city a good old man of eighty years, a foreigner, who was lodging with the late monsignor Archbishop of Myra. They say he is the Patriarch of Antioch. Be that it may, he is alone and has no mark of prelacy". Thekkedath also adds that most probably,  Ahatalla died in Paris.

Oath
The treatment of Ahatalla, shocked the Thomas Christian community, and their wounded feelings effervesced into a mass upsurge that heralded the breaking off from the Padroado of the Portuguese Crown and the Jesuits.
"In case the patriarch cannot be produced, he having been killed by the Paulists [Jesuits], let any other person of the four religious orders come here by order of the supreme pontiff, a man who knows Syriac, and can teach us in our offices, except the Paulists, whom we do not at all desire, because they are enemies of us and of the church of Rome; with that exception let anybody come, and we are ready to obey without hesitation."

The Thomas Christians made one more attempt to reach some kind of compromise before proceeding to extreme measures. They wrote to Archbishop Garcia, requesting him to come and meet them but Garcia refused to accept the invitation. Seeing that the Archbishop thus turned a deaf ear to their insistent pleas, the Thomas Christians became extremely exasperated. On 3 January 1653, Archdeacon Thomas and representatives from the community assembled at St Mary's Church (Nossa Senhora da Vida) at Mattancherry to swear "never to submit to the Portuguese". Standing in front of a granite cross, the oath was read aloud with lighted candles, with the Archdeacon and the leading priests touching the Bible. The number of people who took part in the oath was so significant that all of them could not touch the cross at the same time. Therefore, they held on to ropes tied to the Cross in all directions. Because of the weight, it is said that the cross bent a little and so it is known as Oath of the bent cross (Coonen Kurisu Sathyam)

After this historic oath, out of a population of 200,000 St. Thomas Christians, only 400 remained loyal to Archbishop Garcia.
The event broke the 54-year-old Padroado supremacy of the Portuguese Crown over the Thomas Christians which was imposed at the Synod of Diamper in 1599.

Various interpretations of the events
The exact wordings of the Coonan Cross Oath is disputed. There are various versions on the wording of swearing.

Secondary sources

Stephen Neill
Stephen Neill, a Scottish Anglican Protestant missionary and historian, in his book A History of Christianity in India: The Beginnings to AD 1707 explains the situation as follows:
 " January 1653, priests and people assembled in the church of Our Lady at Mattancherry, and standing in front of a cross and lighted candles swore upon the holy Gospel that they would no longer obey Garcia, and that they would have nothing further to do with the Jesuits they would recognize the Archdeacon as the governor of their Church. This is the famous oath of the "Coonan Cross" (the open-air Cross which stands outside the church at Mattancherry). The Saint Thomas Christians did not at any point suggest that they wished to separate themselves from the Pope. They could no longer tolerate the arrogance of Garcia. And their detestation of the Jesuits, to whose overbearing attitude and lack of sympathy they attributed all their troubles, breathes through all the documents of the time. But let the Pope send them a true bishop, not a Jesuit, and they will be pleased to receive and obey him."

Stephen Neil describes the oath only as an expression of anger against Archbishop Garcia and the Jesuits. Another Church historian  Dietmar W. Winkler also shares the opinion that Coonan Cross Oath was not against the see of Rome, but against the Latin archbishop and the missionary work of the Jesuits.

Robert Eric Frykenberg
Robert Erick Frykenberg, an American historian, narrates the oath in his book Christianity in India From Beginnings to the Present as follows:

 "At Koonen Cross, the assembly of priests (kattanars) and people formally stood before a crucifix and lighted candles and solemnly swore an oath upon the Gospel that they would strive, henceforth, to restore their ancient Church to its former full independence and that they would no longer obey Francis Garcia (SJ) or any other prelate sent by the Pfarangi Church of Rome.

Here, the oath is narrated as an opposition to the Church of Rome itself.

István Perczel
István Perczel, a Hungarian scholar of early Christianity and a leading expert on the Saint Thomas Christians, describes the oath as follows:
Yet, under the Jesuit archbishops that followed him [Francisco Ros] in the see of Cranganore, the situation deteriorated, finally leading to a revolt of the community against the Portuguese and the Jesuits, the celebrated Oath of the Slanting Cross (kūnan kuriśu satyam). The Christians rejected their obedience to the Portuguese and the Jesuits, the then archdeacon, Thomas Pakalomaṭṭam, was consecrated metropolitan of India with the name Mar Thoma, and the community pledged their obedience 
to the Chaldean patriarch.

Primary sources

Letter of Mar Gabriel, East Syriac Metropolitan in Malabar (1705 – 1731)
Mar Gabriel gives a narrative of the Coonan Cross Oath in his letter entitled "The antiquity of the Syrian Christians, and Historical events relating to them" addressed to Jacobus Canter Visscher, a Dutch chaplain at Kochi (1717 –1720). Following is the excerpt from the letter:
In the meantime a priest called Mar Matti [referring to Ahattalla] came to Maliapore sent by the Catholic Patriarch. The Portuguese apprehended him and brought him into the city, and afterwards dragged him to the harbour and cast him into the water. On hearing this, the Christians of Malabar assembled in the church of Mar Tancheri [Mattancherry], took counsel together, bound themselves by oath, and thus threw off the Portuguese yoke from their necks; having first written and signed a letter declaring that from that time forward and for ever, they would have nothing more to do, for good or evil, with the Portuguese.

Version in Angamaly Padiyola of 1787
In Angamaly Padiyola, declaration of the Syrian Catholics (Pazhayakoor faction of Saint Thomas Christians) proclaimed in 1787, narrates the oath as the following:
Our forefathers received the true faith of Jesus Christ at the hands of the Apostle Saint Thomas. Upon this,  Chaldean Syrian bishops ruled over us up to the time of the death of the Metropolitan Mar Abraham, which took place in the East Church of Angamāly in the year 1596. Then the Sanpaloor padre [Jesuits priests] stopped the arrival of other Syrians, and oppressed our people, and ruled over them with an iron rule. However, another Syrian Metran [bishop, referring to Ahattalla] arrived at Cochin with the view of coming to us; but soon the news reached us that he had come to an untimely death by being drowned in the sea. Upon this our forefathers assembled at Mattancherry, and took an oath that neither they themselves, nor their descendants, should ever have anything to do with the Sanpaloor padre. They subsequently assembled at Allangād church, where they duly nominated Archdeacon Thoma as their bishop.

The Church Missionary Society Report for 1818-1819
The Church Missionary Society (CMS) report for the year 1818-19 (page 319) includes an abstract of a brief history of Malankara Syrian Church (Puthenkoor faction of Saint Thomas Christians) preserved among themselves as their history. Here the situation is explained as below: 
The archdeacon addressed letters to all the Syrian churches; and when he had assembled all the priests, students and Christians, they heard that Portuguese had brought Mar Ignatius, the patriarch to Cochin. They all immediately arose and went to Cochin Rajah, decalared to him their grievances, and entered him to deliver their patriarch out of the hands of the Portuguese. The Rajah replied that he would certainly deliver him to them the following morning. He immediately sent for the Portuguese governor of Cochin fort, and said to him "You have confined the patriarch of our Christians, and nothing will satisfy me but your delivering him up to them without any delay". The Portuguese however, gave the Rajah a great sum of money, by the consideration of which he allowed them to retain the prisoner. The same night they tied a great stone to patriarch's neck, and threw him into the sea. In the hour that this was done the Rajah died.After this, all the Syrians assembled in the church at Muttoncherry and thus resolved - "These Portuguese having murdered Mar Ignatius, we will no longer join them. We renounce them, and do not want either their love or their favour. The present Francis, bishop, shall not be our governor. We are not his children or followers. We will not again acknowledge Portuguese bishops."

Version of Punnathara Dionysius III in the letter to the C.M.S.
The version presented in a letter of Dionysious Punnathara (a nineteenth century prelate of the Malankara Syrian Church) to the head of the Anglican Church Missionary Society from a translation of it out of the Syriac original:
"Mar Dionysius, Metropolitan of the Jacobite-Syrians in Malabar, subject to the authority of our Father, Mar Ignatius, Patriarch, who presides in the Apostolic See of Antioch of Syria, beloved of the Messiah. Love from Christ and the people of all the churches to Lord Gambier and ....In the year of our Lord 1653, came our Spiritual Father, Mar Ignatius, the Patriarch, from Antioch to Malabar: but, when the Franks knew this, they brought the Holy Man to the walls of Cochin, imprisoned him in a cell and gave no small money to the King of Cochin. They then brought out the good man, and the drowned him in the sea, and so put him to death. But when we knew this, all the Jacobite Syrians in Malabar assembled in the Church of Mathancherry, which is in Cochin, and we swore a great oath, by the Father, Son, and Holy Ghost, that henceforth we would not adhere to the Franks, nor accept the faith of the Pope of Rome: we accordingly separated from them. A short time after this, some of our people again joined them, and received the faith of the Pope." 
Here, the oath is interpreted as an opposition to the Pope himself.

Version in Idavakapathrika Magazine  published in 1896
As per the Idavakapathrika magazine (book 5, volume 3, Meenam) published in 1896 edited by E.M. Philip, a Syriac Orthodox historian and author, the Mattancherry Padiyola describes the oath as the following:
“On the 3rd of Makaram of the 1653rd year after the birth of Māran [Lord] Isho Mishiha [Jesus Christ], this was the decision declared and executed by the Arcadiakon father and the vicars and native priests of the churches belonging to the diocese of Malankara and everyone else at the church in Mattancherry: that is, since the Patriarch who had been sent to Malankara for us from the holy catholic church was deprived from us by the bishop and the Sanpaloor padre for their interest, we pledge that Bishop Mar Francius who now rule Malankara is no longer our bishop and we are no longer the subjects of his diocese, unless the Patriarch comes to Malankara and we see him before our very eyes. In order for a bishop to rule our church according to the order of the holy church, it is imperative that Thomas Arcadiacon himself should rule from now on. For this cause the executives are Ittithoman Kathanar of Kallissery Church, Kadavil Chandi kathanar of Kaduthuruthy Church, Vengur Geevarghese Kathanar of Angamaly Church and Chandi kathanar of Kuravilangad Church, and all this four be in charge and they must assemble every three years [regularly] to discuss and to order. Kadavil Chandi Kathanar inscribes this as per this declaration.”

Sanpaloor is the equivalent of St. Paul's monastery or town, a Portuguese stronghold near Vaippikotta. It was so called because the Paulists or Jesuits resided there.

Aftermath

After the incident of Coonan Cross Oath, three letters were circulated claiming that they had been sent by Ahathalla. One such letter was read at a meeting at Edappally on 5 February 1653. This letter granted to the archdeacon some powers of the archbishop. On hearing it, a vast crowd enthusiastically welcomed Archdeacon Thomas as the governor of their Church and four senior priests were appointed as his counselors, namely, Kallisseri Anjilimoottil Itty Thommen Kathanar, Kuravilangad Parambil  Palliveettil Chandy Kathanar, Kaduthuruthi Kadavil Chandy Kathanar, Angamali Vengur Giwargis Kathanar. At a further meeting held at Alangat, on 23 May 1653, another letter was read stating that it was from Ahathalla. It instructed the Saint Thomas Christians in the absence of a bishop, twelve of the cattanars (priests) might lay their hands on Thomas, and that this would be adequate as episcopal consecration. The authenticity of these letters is not clear. Some are of the opinion that these letters might be forged by Anjilimoottil Itty Thommen Kathanar who was a skilled Syriac writer. However, Jerome has mentioned about an ancient tradition in the pre-Nicean Church of Alexandria by which a presbyter was elevated as patriarch by laying of hands by twelve fellow presbyters. Consequently, Archdeacon Parambil Thomas was elevated as Metropolitan by the laying on of hands by twelve kattanars and  took the title Thoma I.

Copies of three letters which are said to be written by said to be written by Ahathalla to Saint Thomas Christians are preserved in the archives of the Propaganda Fide and were published in facsimile by Jacob Kollaparambil, a Church historian. In the first letter, Ahathalla  informs Saint Thomas Christians of his coming to India and his detention by the Jesuits; in the second letter, he gives the order for Deacon George (George Parampil, one of his visitors at Mylapore) to be ordained Archdeacon and for the Saint Thomas Christians to establish a body consisting of 12 presbyters, one of whom should be elected as bishop; and in the third letter he legislates that Metropolitan Thoma I should be nominated as Patriarch of all India. István Perczel, observes that the Syriac of these letters is very strange. The first two letters are written in a similar style, incidentally not so good Syriac, but the third one is written in a different style. Some of the historians in Kerala think that second and third letters are forgeries and some consider all three are genuine. Perczel says that it is difficult to conclude the authenticity of these letters; first and second letters are in poor Syriac, with possible Malayalam influences and moreover first letter contains so many absurd errors too; these may be simply due to a copyist, on the other hand, the poor Syriac of the letters and the content style may indicate that they were forged in order to prepare and/or to justify the Coonan Cross revolt, by Saint Thomas Christian priests, having learned Syriac from Francisco Ros. He further highlights that the second letter, which served as basis for the enthronement of the Archdeacon Thomas, does not mention him by name, but on the contrary instructs the Saint Thomas Christians to appoint Deacon George Parambil as the Archdeacon and to establish a body consisting of 12 presbyters in order to elect the Metropolitan after the death of Francis Garcia. Perczel comments that this contradicts the hypothesis of a forgery by the authors of the Coonan Cross revolt. In fact, those who conducted the revolt and ordained Archdeacon Thomas to the bishopric had to distort the contents of this letter to justify what they did among others they attributed to Archdeacon Thomas the rights given by the letter to George Parambil.
 
After the consecration of Thoma I, The information about this consecration was then communicated to all the churches. The vast majority of churches accepted Thoma I as their bishop. Thus, for the first time in history, Thomas Christians had a bishop from among their own people, and chosen by themselves. At this point of time, the Portuguese missionaries attempted reconciliation with Saint Thomas Christians but were not successful. Later, Pope Alexander VII sent a Carmelite priest Joseph Sebastiani as the head of a Carmelite delegation. The Carmelites claimed that the ordination of the archdeacon by the clergy was not in accordance with church law. He managed to persuade the Thomas Christians, including advisors of Thoma I metran Palliveettil Chandy and Kadavil Chandy Kathanar . As the validity of Thoma I's consecration was questioned, he began to lose followers. In the meantime, Sebastiani returned to Rome and was ordained as bishop by Pope on 15 December 1659. Joseph Sebastiani returned to Kerala in 1661 and within a short time period he restored most of the churches that had been with Thoma I to Rome. Thus, by 1663, 84 of the 116 churches in existence were in favor of Sebastiani, leaving only 32 churches in favor of Thoma I. However in 1663, with the conquest of Cochin by the Dutch, the control of the Portuguese on the Malabar coast was lost. The Dutch declared that all the Portuguese missionaries had to leave Kerala. Before leaving Kerala, on 1 February 1663 Sebastiani consecrated Palliveettil Chandy as the Metran of the Thomas Christians who adhered to the Church of Rome.

Thoma I, meanwhile sent requests to various Oriental Churches to receive canonical consecration as bishop. In 1665, Gregorios Abdal Jaleel, a bishop sent by the Syrian Orthodox Patriarch of Antioch, arrived in India and the faction under the leadership of Thoma I welcomed him. The bishop was sent in correspondence to the letter sent by Thoma to the Oriental Orthodox Patriarchate of Antioch. Bishop Abdul Jaleel regularised the Episcopal succession of Thoma I. With this, the split among the Saint Thomas Christians became formal. The faction affiliated with the Catholic Church under Bishop Palliveettil Chandy, referred themselves as Pazhayakuttukar , or "Old Allegiance", and called the branch affiliated with Thoma I as Puthankuttukar, or "New Allegiance". These appellations have been somewhat controversial, though, as both parties considered themselves the true heirs to the Saint Thomas tradition, and saw the other party as schismatic.

This visit of Abdul Jaleel gradually introduced the West Syriac liturgy, customs and script to the Malabar Coast. The visits of prelates from the Syriac Orthodox Church of Antioch continued since then and this led to gradual replacement of the East Syriac Rite liturgy with the West Syriac Rite and the Puthenkoor faction affiliated to the Miaphysite Christology of the Oriental Orthodox Communion. The Pazhayakoor continued with the East Syriac traditions and stayed within the Catholic Church with Diophysite Faith. But following the death of Palliveettil Chandy, in 1687, the church was again fallen under the leadership of foreign missionaries for a long time and had to face challenges to their eastern, syrian  and indigenous heritage and rite.

The Pazhayakoor is the body from which the modern Syro-Malabar Church and Chaldean Syrian Church descend. The Puthenkoor is the body from which the Jacobite Syrian Christian Church, Malankara Orthodox Syrian Church, Saint Thomas Anglicans of the Church of South India, Mar Thoma Syrian Church, St. Thomas Evangelical Church of India, Syro-Malankara Catholic Church and Malabar Independent Syrian Church originate.

See also
 Indo-Persian ecclesiastical relations
 Malankara Church
 Goa Inquisition
 Synod of Diamper

Notes

Bibliography

External links

 History of the Orthodox Church
 History of the Syro-Malabar Church
 Jacobite Syrian Church

Church of the East in India
Catholic Church in India
Oriental Orthodoxy in India
History of Kerala
Portuguese in Kerala
17th-century Eastern Catholicism
17th century in Portuguese India
Political uprisings in India
1653 in Christianity
1653 in India
Mattancherry